Charity Adams Earley (5 December 1918 – 13 January 2002) was an American United States Army officer. She was the first African-American woman to be an officer in the Women's Army Auxiliary Corps (later WACS) and was the commanding officer of the first battalion of African-American women to serve overseas during World War II. Adams was the highest-ranking African-American woman in the army by the completion of the war. The 6888th Central Postal Directory Battalion's motto was "No Mail, Low Morale." A monument honoring this unique group of women was dedicated at Fort Leavenworth, Kansas on November 30, 2018.

Early life and education
Adams was born on December 5, 1918 in Kittrell, North Carolina and grew up in Columbia, South Carolina. Her parents believed strongly in education and were high achievers. Her father, a college graduate, was an African Methodist Episcopal minister. Her mother was a schoolteacher. Adams was the oldest of four children. She graduated from Booker T. Washington High School as valedictorian and from Wilberforce University in Ohio in 1938, majoring in math and physics. After graduation, she returned to Columbia where she taught mathematics at the local high school while studying part-time for a M.A. degree in psychology at the Ohio State University, receiving her master's degree in 1946.

Career

Adams enlisted in the U.S. Army's Women's Army Auxiliary Corps (WAAC) in July 1942. She was the first African-American woman to be an officer in the WAAC. At the time, the U.S. Army was still segregated, so she was placed in a company with fellow female African-American women officers and stationed at Fort Des Moines. In 1943, she was assigned to be the training supervisor at base headquarters.

In early 1944, Adams was reassigned as the Training Center control officer in charge of improving efficiency and job training. She also had other responsibilities, such as surveying officer (finding lost property) and summary court officer (handling women's minor offenses).

In December 1944, Adams led the only company of black WACs ever to serve overseas. They were stationed in Birmingham, England. The women began to socialize with the citizens and broke through prejudices on both sides. Adams was put in charge of a postal directory service unit. Another part of her job included raising the morale of women. Adams achieved this by creating beauty parlors for the women to relax and socialize in.

In March 1945, she was appointed the commanding officer of the first battalion of African-American women, the 6888th Central Postal Directory Battalion. They were stationed first in Birmingham. Three months later, they were moved to Rouen, France, then to Paris. They were responsible for the delivery of mail to over seven million soldiers during World War II.

By the completion of the war, Lieutenant Colonel Adams was the highest ranking African-American woman in the military. At the conclusion of the war, when asked about her ground breaking achievements, Adams responded simply, "I just wanted to do my job". She decided to leave the service in 1946 when she was called to serve at the Pentagon.

Fighting segregation and racism in the Army 

Growing up in the south, Adams experienced the hardships of segregation. When she entered the Army, she still faced discrimination but was not afraid to speak up and fight for desegregation in the Army. One of the first battles Adams fought for equality was when the Army proposed segregating the training regiment. When she was told she would head one of the segregated regiments, she refused. The Army subsequently decided against creating separate regiments.

On another occasion, when a general stated, "I'm going to send a white first lieutenant down here to show you how to run this unit", then Major Adams responded, "Over my dead body, sir." The general threatened to court-martial her for disobeying orders. She then began to file charges against him for using "language stressing racial segregation" and ignoring a directive from Allied headquarters. They both dropped the matter, and the general later came to respect Adams.

When the Red Cross tried to donate equipment for a new segregated recreation center, Adams refused it because her unit had been sharing the recreation center with white units.

Adams encouraged her battalion to socialize with white men coming back from the front and even the residents of wherever they were stationed. She wanted to create comradeship between enlisted personnel and officers and ease the tensions of racism.

Educator
After her service in the Army, she earned a master's degree in psychology from Ohio State University. She then worked at the Veterans Administration in Cleveland, Ohio, but soon left to teach at the Miller Academy of Fine Arts. She moved to Nashville, Tennessee and was the director of student personnel at Tennessee A&I College. She then moved to Georgia and became the director of student personnel and assistant professor of education at Georgia State College.

Community service 
Adams devoted much of her post-war life to community service. She served on the Board of Directors of Dayton Power and Light, the Dayton Metro Housing Authority, the Dayton Opera Company, the Board of Governors of the American Red Cross, and the Board of Trustees of Sinclair Community College. She volunteered for United Way, the United Negro College Fund, the Urban League, and the YWCA. She also co-directed the Black Leadership Development Program.

Personal life
In 1949, Adams married Stanley A. Earley, Jr. They moved to Switzerland for a time while Stanley completed medical school. They returned to the U.S. in 1952 and settled in Dayton, Ohio where they had two children, Stanley III and Judith Earley.

Adams died at age 83 on January 13, 2002, in Dayton.

Awards and honors
Adams received many honors and awards, including a Woman of the Year from the National Council of Negro Women in 1946, the Top Ten Women of the Miami Valley Dayton Daily News, 1965 and Service to the Community Award from the Ohio State Senate in 1989. In 1987, she received the Senior Citizens Gold Watch Award. Adams was listed on the Smithsonian Institution's 110 most important historical Black women, Black Women Against the Odds, in 1982. She was inducted into the Ohio Women's Hall of Fame in 1979 and the Ohio Veterans Hall of Fame in 1993. She was also inducted into the South Carolina Black Hall of Fame and named citizen of the year by The Montgomery County Board of Commissioners in 1991. In 1997, Adams was included in the BellSouth African-American History Calendar.

She also received honorary doctorates from Wilberforce University and the University of Dayton in 1991.

On August 8, 2022, The Naming Commission of the US Department of Defense made recommendations for US Army post name changes for facilities named after Confederate soldiers.  Among them was Fort Lee (Virginia), to be changed to Fort Gregg-Adams, after Lieutenant General Arthur J. Gregg and Lieutenant Colonel Charity Adams Earley.  On October 6, 2022 Secretary of Defense Lloyd Austin accepted the recommendation and directed the name change occur no later than January 1, 2024.

Works

See also

References

External links

 Book review of Old Glory Stories: American Combat Leadership in World War II by Cole C. Kingseed, which includes a chapter on Adams
 Charity Adams Earley Papers / Collection Summary in the Library of Congress
 Spring, Kelly. "Charity Earley". National Women's History Museum. 2017.
 

1918 births
2002 deaths
United States Army personnel of World War II
African-American female military personnel
People from Columbia, South Carolina
Women's Army Corps soldiers
Wilberforce University alumni
Ohio State University Graduate School alumni
Tennessee State University faculty
Savannah State University faculty
People from Kittrell, North Carolina
Military personnel from North Carolina
Military personnel from South Carolina
United States Army colonels
American women academics
20th-century African-American women
20th-century African-American people
21st-century African-American people
21st-century African-American women
African-American United States Army personnel